Pinzón is a surname. Notable persons with that surname include:

 Pinzón brothers, Spanish navigators who accompanied Christopher Columbus.
 Martín Alonso Pinzón (c. 1441 – c. 1493), Captain of the Pinta on Columbus's first voyage
  (c. 1445 – c. 1502), Master of the Pinta on Columbus's first voyage
 Vicente Yáñez Pinzón (c. 1462 – c. 1514), Captain of the Niña on the first voyage of discovery
 Chavelita Pinzón, Panamanian folklorist and singer
 Daniel Chanis Pinzón, former president of Panama
 Pedro Miguel González Pinzón, Panamanian politician who as of September 2007 is president of the National Assembly of Panama

See also
 Pinzon (disambiguation)

Surnames from nicknames